Mehdi Kazemi (مهدی کاظمی, born 1989) is an Iranian man who is wanted in Iran for sodomy. Originally in the UK to study, he was granted asylum by Britain in 2008.

Background
Since the 1979 Iranian revolution, the legal code has been based on a conservative interpretation of Islamic Shari'a law. All sexual relations outside of heterosexual marriage (i.e. sodomy or adultery) are illegal and no legal distinction is made between consensual or non-consensual sexual activity. Homosexual relations that occur between consenting adults in private are a crime and carry a maximum punishment of death.

Asylum case
Kazemi then fled to the Netherlands to apply for political asylum, but was refused in accordance with the 2003 Dublin Convention, which prevents application for asylum in more than one EU country.  Kazemi was held in a detention centre pending return to the UK.  If he returned to Iran he would have been at risk of imprisonment. After a sustained campaign by several supporters, including Simon Hughes, Michael Cashman MEP, Peter Tatchell and Middle East Workers' Solidarity, Home secretary Jacqui Smith agreed to review his case when he returned to the UK. He was refused asylum in the Netherlands and returned to the UK April 4, 2008.

On March 22, Middle East Workers' Solidarity and National Union of Students staged a protest opposite Downing Street in defence of Kazemi. Several LGBT student organisations also attended, including the Manchester, Bradford, and Leeds University LGBT Societies. The demonstration demanded that Kazemi should not be sent to Iran, and that he should be allowed to stay in Britain.

On May 20, it was confirmed that Kazemi's case for asylum had been accepted by the British government.

See also 
 LGBT rights in Iran
 Homosexuality and Islam
 Kiana Firouz

References

External links

 Iranian Queer Organisation
 IRAN: UK GRANTS ASYLUM TO VICTIM OF TEHRAN PERSECUTION OF GAYS, CITING PUBLICITY, Passed to the Telegraph by WikiLeaks, 04 Feb 2011 (original date: 5/22/2008)

1989 births
Iranian LGBT people
Gay men
Living people
Iranian emigrants to the United Kingdom